Skouris is a surname. Notable people with the surname include:

 Vassilios Skouris (born 1948), Greek judge
 Maia Skouris, fictional character
 Diana Skouris, fictional character